66N may refer to:

 66°NORTH, a clothing manufacturer in Iceland
 66th parallel north (Latitude 66°N), a line of latitude close to the Arctic Circle
 Interstate 66N, proposed name of the never-constructed Interstate 266, a road between Washington, D.C. and Arlington County Virginia

See also
 N66 (disambiguation)